Rosalinda "Ros" Fogliani is Western Australia’s first female State Coroner. 

Fogliani attended the University of Western Australia. In 1985, she was admitted as a barrister and solicitor of the Supreme Court of Western Australia. From 1993-2011, she was employed at the Office of the Commonwealth Director of Public Prosecutions. After returning to private practice as a barrister, Fogliani was appointed on January 13, 2014 as the first female State Coroner of Western Australia.

She is most known for her inquest in the death of Ms Dhu, an Aboriginal Australian woman who died while in police custody in Western Australia in 2016. Her findings revealed that Dhu was subjected to inhumane police treatment. While Fogliani did not recommend police prosecution, she did request that the practice of jailing individuals for unpaid fines be ceased. Fogliani has continued to work on other high profile cases. In 2019, she launched an inquest into the suicides of indigenous children.

See also 

 List of first women lawyers and judges in Oceania

References 

Australian women lawyers
20th-century Australian lawyers
Australian coroners
University of Western Australia alumni
Year of birth missing (living people)
Living people
21st-century Australian lawyers
20th-century women lawyers
21st-century women lawyers
20th-century Australian women